Kalinda or Calinda is a martial art and associated dance form of the Caribbean.

Kalinda may also refer to:

People
Kalinda Ashton, an Australian writer and academic
Kalinda Howarth, an Australian rules footballer
Kalinda Vazquez, an American television writer and producer

Arts and entertainment
Kalinda, a character in the Star Trek: New Frontier novels
Kalinda, a novel by Evan Green
Kalinda Sharma, a character in the television series The Good Wife
Professor Kalinda, a character in the Doctor Who audiobook The Four Doctors

Other
Kalinda, a legendary King of Tripura in the Bengali verse chronicle Rajmala
Kalinda Primary School, in the City of Maroondah, Victoria, Australia
Kalinda School, a school in New South Wales, Australia

See also
Calinda (disambiguation)
Kalenda (disambiguation)
Calends